Brahim Sabaouni (13 May 1995) is a professional football player who plays as a midfielder for AS FAR. Born in France, he represented Morocco at under-23 international level.

International career
Sabaouni was called up and capped for the Morocco U23s in a friendly 1-0 win against the Cameroon U23s.

References

External links
 

1994 births
Footballers from Lille
French sportspeople of Moroccan descent
Living people
Moroccan footballers
Morocco youth international footballers
French footballers
Association football midfielders
Nike Academy players
Lierse S.K. players
A.F.C. Tubize players
R.F.C. Seraing (1922) players
AS FAR (football) players
Championnat National 3 players
Challenger Pro League players
Botola players
Moroccan expatriate footballers
Expatriate footballers in Belgium
Moroccan expatriate sportspeople in Belgium
French expatriate footballers
French expatriate sportspeople in Belgium